Zsuzsanna "Susan" Francia (born November 8, 1982) is a Hungarian-American two time Olympic gold medalist rower. Growing up in Abington, Pennsylvania, she attended Abington Senior High School, followed by the University of Pennsylvania, graduating in 2004 with bachelor's and a master's degrees in Criminology and Sociology. She currently resides in Princeton, New Jersey, and is affiliated with the US Rowing Training Center.

Francia is the daughter of Hungarian biochemist and renowned mRNA researcher Katalin Karikó. She is fluent in Hungarian.

Rowing career
Francia began rowing as a sophomore at the University of Pennsylvania in 2001. She was a Collegiate Rowing Coaches Association Division I All-American at the University of Pennsylvania in 2004. After graduating, she spent ten years as a member of the U.S. Rowing Senior National Team and won a gold medal in women's eight at the 2008 Olympics in Beijing, China and the 2012 Olympics in London, England.

Francia won the Remenham Cup Remenham Challenge Cup at the 2011 and 2006 Henley Royal Regatta.  At the FISA World Rowing Championships in 2006, Francia won the gold medal in the women's eight with a new world's best time of 5:55.50.

In addition to her international accomplishments, she won the championship eight at the 2005, 2006, 2007, 2009, and 2012 Head of the Charles Regatta in Cambridge, Massachusetts. She won the eight and finished third in the pair at the 2007 US Rowing National Championships. She won the double sculls at the second 2006 National Selection Regatta and finished second in the four at the 2004 U.S. National Team Trials. Francia finished second in the pair at the second 2008 National Selection Regatta, won the pair at all three 2010 Regattas  and won the pair at the second 2011 Regatta.

Coaching 
Francia has been an assistant coach for UCSD Women's Rowing team for the 2017–18 and 2018–19 seasons. In addition, she was formerly the head coach of the Junior Women's Varsity Rowing team at the San Diego Rowing Club.

References

External links
 

Living people
1982 births
Hungarian emigrants to the United States
University of Pennsylvania alumni
Olympic gold medalists for the United States in rowing
Rowers at the 2008 Summer Olympics
Rowers at the 2012 Summer Olympics
American female rowers
Medalists at the 2012 Summer Olympics
Medalists at the 2008 Summer Olympics
World Rowing Championships medalists for the United States
21st-century American women